Sudie Bond (July 13, 1923  – November 10, 1984) was an American actress on film, stage, and television.

Early years
Bond was one of four children of J. Roy Bond, an industrialist, and Carrie Bond. She grew up in Elizabethtown, Kentucky, and was active in horsemanship competition as a youngster and during her years in college. By 1938, she was acting in plays. In 1940, she graduated from the Fassifern School in Hendersonville, North Carolina. She went on to attend Virginia Intermont College and Rollins College, where she was a member of the Rollins Student Players.

Career
In 1945, Bond appeared in the supporting cast of Slice It Thin! at the Blackfriars Guild.

Bond also worked as choreographer for the play From Morn Till Midnight.

Films in which Bond acted included The Gold Bug, Johnny Dangerously, Love Story, Silkwood, Swing Shift, and Where the Lilies Bloom. On television, she portrayed Violet Stapleton, Rita's mother, on Guiding Light. She also appeared on All in the Family, Benson, Flo, Mary Hartman, Mary Hartman, Maude, and Television Playhouse.

Bond's Broadway debut occurred in Summer and Smoke (1952). Her other roles on Broadway included Olga in Tovarich (1952), Estelle in The Waltz of the Toreadors (1957), Justine in The Egg (1962), Miss Prose in Harold (1962), Mrs. Lazar in My Mother, My Father and Me (1963), Miss Hammer in The Impossible Years (1965), Betsy Jane in Keep It In the Family (1967), Old Woman in Box / Quotations From Chairman Mao Tse-Tung (1968), Grandma in The Death of Bessie Smith / The American Dream (1968), Mrs. Margolin in Forty Carats (1968), Clara in Hay Fever (1970), Miss Lynch in Grease (1972), Street Lady in Thieves (1974), and Juanita in Come Back to the Five and Dime, Jimmy Dean, Jimmy Dean (1982).

Her off-Broadway credits included The Shepherd's Chameleon (1960), The American Dream / The Death of Bessie Smith (1961), The Zoo Story / The American Dream (1962), The American Dream / Dutchman (1964), Home Movies / Softly Consider the Nearness (1964), The Great Western Union (1965), The Memorandum (1968), The Local Stigmatic (1969), and The Cherry Orchard (1976).

Death
Bond was found dead in her New York City apartment on November 10, 1984. Her death was attributed to a respiratory ailment.

Recognition 
Bond won three Obie Awards for her performances in the off-Broadway plays The American Dream, The Endgame, and The Sandbox.

References 

 

Age controversies
1984 deaths
20th-century American actresses
American film actresses
American soap opera actresses
American stage actresses
American television actresses
Actresses from Kentucky
People from Elizabethtown, Kentucky